The Minnesota Golden Gophers attempted to win the NCAA Tournament for the third time in school history.

Offseason
 June 18: Six University of Minnesota players have been named to the United States Under-22 Team. Megan Bozek, Sarah Erickson, Amanda Kessel, Anne Schleper, Jen Schoullis and Emily West have all been named to the team. The Minnesota contingent is the largest group from one school. The U22 team will depart from the Festival early and travel to Toronto to compete in the three-game Under-22 Series against Canada from August 18–21.
 June 18: Brad Frost announced the hiring of Joel Johnson as an assistant coach. Johnson was the head coach of the Bethel University men's hockey team. Previously, he was an assistant coach during the Golden Gophers' 2000 and 2004 national championships. Johnson replaces Jamie Wood, who accepted an associate head coaching position at the University of New Hampshire.

Exhibition

Regular season
 October 1: In her first game as a Golden Gopher, Amanda Kessel registered four points (two goals, two assists). The following day, Kessel scored the game-winning goal as the Gophers won by a 3-0 score. The game against Clarkson marked the first time in school history that the Gophers opened a season against a ranked opponent.
 October 9: With the 1-0 shutout over Wayne State, the Gophers have not allowed a goal  in 180 minutes. Dating back to the 2009-10 season, Minnesota has not allowed a goal in 200:45 minutes played.
 October 22–23: Anne Schleper had six points (1 goal, 5 assists), including four points on the power-play. In the first game, Schleper tied a career-high with four points. She assisted on Sarah Davis' game-winning power-play goal. The following day, Schleper assisted on two of Minnesota's three power-play goals. Schleper is the first defender to earn the league's weekly offensive honor since Minnesota Duluth's Jocelyne Larocque on Jan. 28, 2009.
 October 22–23: Noora Räty recorded back to back shutouts against the St. Cloud State Huskies. She held the Huskies scoreless as Minnesota swept the series by scores of 5-0 and 3-0, respectively. Raty played the full 120:00 minutes of the series. She accumulated14 saves in the first game, while posting 18 in the second game. In the season, she has yet to allow a goal, holding a 1.000 save percentage and a 0.00 goalsagainst
average.
 The January 29, 2011 game between Wisconsin and Minnesota was played before a women's college hockey record crowd of 10,668.
 Feb. 5: The Golden Gophers had four different skaters score goals in a 4-1 win over St. Cloud State. Amanda Kessel contributed with a goal and two assists as the Gophers earned their 20th win of the season. With the win and a Bemidji State loss to Wisconsin, the Gophers have clinched home ice for the first round of the WCHA playoffs.
 February 4–5: Amanda Kessel produced three goals and seven points to lead the Golden Gophers to a two-game home-ice series sweep over St. Cloud State. On February 4, she scored two goals and set up two others for four points as the Gophers prevailed by an 8-0 mark. Her four points tied a career game high, which came against Clarkson in her first collegiate game on Oct. 1. The following day, she was involved in all three Gophers goals, as she scored one and assisted on two. One of the assists was Ashley Stenerson's first collegiate goal.

Standings

Schedule

Conference record

Roster

Postseason
 March 4: Amanda Kessel scored a hat trick in the semifinal of the 2011 WCHA Final Face-off as Minnesota defeated the defending NCAA champion Minnesota-Duluth Bulldogs by a 4-2 tally.

WCHA Final Faceoff

NCAA regional match
The Golden Gophers participated in the regional matches of the 2011 NCAA Women's Division I Ice hockey Tournament. It was the first time that Boston College beat Minnesota in NCAA history.

Awards and honors
 Megan Bozek, WCHA Defensive Player of the Week (Week of February 23, 2011)
 Sarah Davis, WCHA Rookie of the Week, (Week of January 26, 2011)
 Amanda Kessel, WCHA Pre-Season Rookie of the Year
 Amanda Kessel, WCHA Rookie of the Week (Week of October 5)
 Amanda Kessel, WCHA Rookie of the Week (Week of December 15) 
 Amanda Kessel, WCHA Offensive Player of the Week (Week of February 7)
 Noora Raty, WCHA Defensive Player of the Week (Week of October 27, 2010)
 Anne Schleper, WCHA co-Offensive Players of the Week (Week of October 27, 2010)
 Kelly Terry, WCHA Rookie of the Week (Week of December 7)

Postseason honors
 Amanda Kessel, WCHA Rookie of the Year
 Noora Raty, 2011 Second Team All-America selection
 Anne Schleper, 2011 Big Ten Outstanding Sportsmanship Award

WCHA First Team
 Noora Raty
 Anne Schleper

WCHA Third team
 Megan Bozek
 Amanda Kessel

WCHA All-Rookie Team
 Baylee Gillanders
 Amanda Kessel
 Kelly Terry

WCHA All-Academic Team
 Megan Bozek
 Samantha Downey
 Sarah Erickson
 Alyssa Grogan
 Mira Jalosuo
 Becky Kortum
 Nikki Ludwigson
 Jenny Lura
 Noora Räty
 Anne Schleper

References

M
M
Minnesota Golden Gophers women's ice hockey seasons
Minne
Minne